Indian Uprising is a 1952 American Western film directed by Ray Nazarro and starring George Montgomery, Audrey Long and Carl Benton Reid.

Plot
Arizona 1885 – Cavalry Captain Case McCloud (George Montgomery) tries to maintain the treaty between the Apache led by Geronimo (Miguel Inclan – who had previously played Cochise in John Ford's Fort Apache) and the government that keeps white prospectors off Apache territory. But local Tucson businessmen stir up trouble and when a new cavalry commander Maj. Nathan Stark (Robert Shayne) arrives, he recalls his troops and allows local prospectors back to their mines. McCloud does everything in his power to stop all out war.

Cast
 George Montgomery as Capt. Case McCloud
 Audrey Long as Norma Clemson
 Carl Benton Reid as John Clemson
 Eugene Iglesias as Sgt. Ramirez
 John Baer as 2nd. Lt. Whitely
 Joe Sawyer as Sgt. Maj. Phineas T. Keogh
 Robert Shayne as Maj. Nathan Stark
 Robert Foster Dover as Tubai (as Robert Dover)
 Eddie Waller as Sagebrush
 Douglas Kennedy as Cliff Taggert
 Miguel Inclán as Geronimo (as Miguel Inclan)
 Hugh Sanders as Ben Alsop
 Stanley Blystone as Miner (uncredited)
 Charles Evans as Secretary of War (uncredited)

Production
Made in Supercinecolor, the film was produced by Bernard Small for Edward Small Productions.

See also
 List of American films of 1952

References

External links
 
 
 Indian Uprising at TCMDB

1952 films
1950s English-language films
1952 Western (genre) films
Films set in 1885
Western (genre) cavalry films
American Western (genre) films
Apache Wars films
Films set in Arizona
Films produced by Edward Small
Films directed by Ray Nazarro
Columbia Pictures films
Cinecolor films
1950s American films
Films with screenplays by Richard Schayer
Cultural depictions of Geronimo